Sèrge Kevyn Aboué Angoué (born 3 August 1994) is a Gabonese professional footballer who plays as a forward for the Gabon national team.

Career
Born in Port-Gentil, Kevyn began his career in Portugal with AD Nogueirense before joining Marítimo B. He stayed at the club for a season before signing with fellow Portuguese side Vizela. After another season he signed with Campeonato de Portugal side Leiria. On August 2019, he signed for Mumbai City in the Indian Super League.

International
Kevyn made his international debut on 5 March 2014 for Gabon in a friendly against Morocco. He came on as a substitute as Gabon drew 1–1.

Career statistics

References

External links 
 
 

1994 births
Living people
People from Port-Gentil
Gabonese footballers
A.D. Nogueirense players
F.C. Vizela players
U.D. Leiria players
C.D. Fátima players
Al-Ittihad Club (Tripoli) players
Mumbai City FC players
Association football forwards
Gabon international footballers
Gabonese expatriate footballers
Expatriate footballers in Portugal
Gabonese expatriate sportspeople in Portugal
Expatriate footballers in Libya
Gabonese expatriate sportspeople in Libya
Expatriate footballers in India
Gabonese expatriate sportspeople in India
2017 Africa Cup of Nations players
Libyan Premier League players
21st-century Gabonese people